Anbiyān is a sub-district located in the Al-Misrakh District, Taiz Governorate, Yemen. Anbiyān had a population of 2,742 according to the 2004 census.

Villages
Dhi ash-Sharḥ
Al-Kashrar
Al-Lafag
Dhahrat Anbiyan

References

Sub-districts in Al-Misrakh District